Have You Ever Seen the Rain is an album by jazz saxophonist Stanley Turrentine, his third recorded for the Fantasy label, featuring performances by Turrentine with Freddie Hubbard and an orchestra arranged and conducted by Gene Page. The album was rereleased on CD in 1999 combined with Turrentine's 1980 album Use the Stairs as On a Misty Night.

Reception
The Allmusic review by Christian Genzel awarded the album 1½ stars and states "the record's kitsch level is extremely high, and just when you think it can't get any cheesier, the album always goes that extra mile. But on a positive note, for some people at least, this might turn out to be one of the most beautiful and romantic albums of all time, if they're deeply in love and listening to this together with or without their object of desire. Perhaps this is exactly the kind of album you'd like to put on when you're with your girlfriend. Turrentine and Hubbard's playing is undeniably beautiful and romantic — and there's something about this album which makes it a bit hard to dislike, perhaps because it'd be all too easy to dismiss it. It's probably also due to the fact that Stanley is always very sincere about what he does; he just wants to play ballads. With cynicism put aside, it's not easy to decide whether this record is a hideous cash-in, cheesy beyond belief, or if it's an unfiltered taste of Stanley's most romantic side. Perhaps it's both".

Track listing
 "That's The Way Of The World" - 6:30  
 "Touching You" - 6:17  
 "T's Dream" - 7:13  
 "You" - 5:30  
 "Reasons" - 5:35  
 "Have You Ever Seen The Rain" - 4:00  
 "Tommy's Tune" - 3:30  
Recorded at Fantasy Studios, Berkeley, CA in July, 1975

Personnel
Stanley Turrentine - tenor saxophone
Freddie Hubbard - trumpet, flugelhorn
Gene Page - keyboards, arranger, conductor
Vincent DeRosa - French horn
Patrice Rushen - keyboards
Clark Spangler - synthesizer
Jay Graydon, David T. Walker - guitar
Ron Carter (tracks 1-5 & 7), Scott Edwards (track 6) - bass
Jack DeJohnette (tracks 1, 2 & 4-7), Harvey Mason (track 3) - drums 
Eddie "Bongo" Brown - congas
Jim Gilstrap, John Lehman, Marti McCall, Jackie Waid, Carolyn Willis - vocals
Unidentified strings - Harry Bluestone - concertmaster

References

1975 albums
Stanley Turrentine albums
Fantasy Records albums
Albums arranged by Gene Page